The 2018 SWAC men's basketball tournament was the postseason men's basketball tournament for the Southwestern Athletic Conference for the 2017–18 season. Tournament first round games were played at the campus of the higher seeded team on March 6. The remainder of the tournament was held on March 9 and 10, 2018 at the Delmar Fieldhouse in Houston.

Texas Southern won the tournament by defeating Arkansas–Pine Bluff in the championship game, the Tigers' second consecutive championship. As a result, Texas Southern received the conference's automatic bid to the NCAA tournament.

Seeds

The top eight teams competed in the conference tournament. Teams were seeded by record within the conference, with a tiebreaker system to seed teams with identical conference records. Grambling State, the conference's regular season champion, was ineligible for postseason play due to APR violations.

Schedule and results

Bracket

First round games at campus sites of lower-numbered seeds

References

SWAC men's basketball tournament
2017–18 Southwestern Athletic Conference men's basketball season
Basketball in Houston